Daily Sach (SACH) is an Indian Urdu-language daily newspaper published from Jammu, India founded in 1940 by Raja Mohammad Akbar Khan with roots in the Indian independence movement ("SACH" means Truth in Urdu), it was established with a principle to publish the news and aware the people of United India about the historical changes that were taking place in the British Indian Empire. It is now owned and published by Sach Group, which is owned by Krishan Lal Gupta.

History

19th century
Daily Sach was founded in 1940 in Mirpur, PoK by Raja Mohammad Akbar Khan, during Indian independence movement under British Raj, and was published weekly. It contained news from India and the world, as well as the Indian Subcontinent. The daily editions of the paper were started in late 19th century. Raja Mohammad Akbar Khan in 1946 before his death had passed the ownership of newspaper to Master Roshan Lal (also known as Master Ji) who was his close friend. A freedom fighter, who later became active member of Nation Conference and Member of Legislative Council from Jammu region. After INDO-PAK partition Master Ji started publishing the newspaper from Jammu. With time, Daily Sach had a sizeable circulation in Jammu, Srinagar and even its readership outside India and later in 1995 paper was passed to Master Ji’s younger Brother Krishan Lal Gupta due to health issues.

20th century

Throughout the 20th century, this paper acted as a flag bearer for Indian journalism, covering major events in India and the world spanning various fields including politics, science, sports, lifestyle.

21st century
Daily Sach upgraded to digital computerized printing from hand written publication, where upon, a copy of paper written by the calligraphers, known as katibs is processed onto a photo negative and mass-produced within a printing press. Daily Sach consolidated itself as the oldest Urdu newspaper with the largest Urdu daily circulation in Jammu.

See also

 Master Roshan Lal
 Raja Mohammad Akbar Khan
 Krishan Lal Gupta

References

External links
 

Asian news websites
Urdu-language newspapers published in India
National newspapers published in India
Daily newspapers published in India
Newspapers established in 1940
1940 establishments in India